Louise Geneviève de La Hye née Rousseau (8 March 1810 - 17 November 1838) was a French pianist, organist and composer, who sometimes used the pseudonym M. Leon Saint-Amons.

Life and career
Louise Geneviève Rousseau was born in Charenton, France, daughter of Charles-Louis Rousseau and grand niece of philosopher Jean-Jacques Rousseau. She studied piano with her father and with Louis Joseph Saint-Amans, and in 1821 entered the Paris Conservatory.

Rousseau began teaching at the Conservatory in 1930, but moved to Cambrai after she married. She had two children and returned to Paris in 1834 where she continued teaching and composing. She suffered from poor health and died in Paris at the age of 28.

Works
De La Hye composed works including an opera, cantatas, masses, piano works, duos and string quartets. Selected compositions include:
Le songe de la religieuse
Six mélodies italiennes

Her Méthode d'orgue expressif was published after her death.

References

1810 births
1838 deaths
19th-century classical composers
French music educators
French classical composers
French women classical composers
19th-century French composers
Women music educators
19th-century women composers